Mystic Mountain is in the Beartooth Mountains in the U.S. state of Montana.

References

Mystic
Beartooth Mountains
Mountains of Park County, Montana